Jiří Vašíček (born 31 December 1980) is a Czech professional ice hockey defenceman who plays for HC CSOB Pojistovna Pardubice of the Czech Extraliga.

Vašíček previously played for KLH Vajgar Jindřichův Hradec and HC Rebel Havlíčkův Brod.

References

1980 births
Living people
BK Havlíčkův Brod players
Czech ice hockey defencemen
HC Dvůr Králové nad Labem players
HC Dynamo Pardubice players
HC Kometa Brno players
HC Košice players
HC Slavia Praha players
HC Stadion Litoměřice players
HC Vrchlabí players
KLH Vajgar Jindřichův Hradec players
Stadion Hradec Králové players
Sportspeople from Pardubice
Czech expatriate ice hockey players in Slovakia